The Sunshine State Conference is a college athletic conference affiliated with the National Collegiate Athletic Association (NCAA) at the Division II level. All of its member institutions are located in the state of Florida, which is popularly known as the Sunshine State.

The conference was originally formed in 1975 as a men's basketball conference. It has since expanded to sponsor championships in 18 sports, including men's and women's basketball, baseball, men's and women's cross country, men's and women's golf, men's and women's lacrosse, women's rowing, men's and women's soccer, softball, men's and women's swimming, men's and women's tennis, women's volleyball.

SSC institutions have won a total of 111 NCAA national team championships, including a conference record seven in the 2014–15 and 2018–19 academic years. The conference has also claimed a total of 90 national runner-up trophies.

History

The conference was preceded by the Florida Intercollegiate Conference, which was disbanded in the mid-1960s. The Sunshine State Conference was founded in 1975 by Saint Leo University (then Saint Leo College) basketball coach & athletic director Norm Kaye. Kaye served as Commissioner the first year until Dick Pace was named Commissioner in 1976. Kaye continued as Executive Director of the Conference for an additional 12 years. Pace was inducted into the Florida Sports Hall of Fame in 1985.

The six charter Conference members were: Biscayne College (now St. Thomas University), Florida Technological University (now University of Central Florida), Eckerd College, Florida Southern College, Rollins College, and Saint Leo College.

The Conference has seen dozens of athletes go on to have successful professional careers. Some examples include: Current PGA Tour players Lee Janzen and Rocco Mediate went to Florida Southern. Janzen won golf's U.S. Open in 1993 & 1998; on the baseball side are Tino Martinez (Tampa),  Tim Wakefield (Florida Tech), Ryan Hanigan (Rollins), Bob Tewksbury (Saint Leo), and J. D. Martinez (Nova Southeastern). Wakefield tied a career high of 17 wins pitching for the 2007 World Series Champion Boston Red Sox and Tewksbury was third in balloting for the National League Cy Young Award while going 16–5 for the St. Louis Cardinals in 1992.

Chronological timeline

 March 2, 1975 – Basketball conference exploration meeting is held at Florida Southern College in Lakeland. Main purpose of meeting is to discuss formation of an NCAA Division II mid-Florida basketball conference.
 March 16, 1975 – Second exploration meeting is held at Eckerd College in St. Petersburg. The name "Sunshine State Conference" is suggested by Dr. Calvin C. Miller and is adopted for league use. Norm Kaye of Saint Leo is named Interim Commissioner. Dr. Thomas B. Southard, president of Saint Leo College, is named as first conference president.
 June 1975 – Conference constitution adopted.
 October 8, 1975 – First meeting of the SSC is held in Orlando. Basketball regulations and league bylaws are revised and approved.
 December 3, 1975 – Florida Southern defeats Eckerd, 96–84, in first SSC basketball game played in Saint Petersburg.
 April 8, 1976 – Dick Pace is named league commissioner. NCAA approves automatic bid for SSC basketball champion. Golf and Tennis are added to league for 1976–77, baseball and soccer are added for 1977–78.
 May 18, 1977 – First Sunshine State Conference men's basketball tournament held
 February 1, 1981 – Norm Kaye of Saint Leo is appointed as executive of SSC. Executive Committee is formed, consisting of league athletic directors.
 July 1, 1981 – Florida Institute of Technology joins the Sunshine State Conference.
 September 2, 1981 – The University of Tampa joins the Sunshine State Conference.
 April 15, 1982 – League adopts women's competition in basketball, cross country, slow-pitch softball, tennis, and volleyball.
 May 1, 1984 – University of Central Florida (formerly Florida Technological University) withdraws from the conference. Women's fast-pitch softball is adopted for league play in 1985.
 February 2, 1986 – Bob Vanatta, athletic director at Louisiana Tech University, is named as league's first full-time commissioner.
 June 13, 1988 – Barry University joins the conference.
 November 1990 – Conference signs a two-year contract with the Sunshine Network for seven events.
 February 11, 1991 – University of North Florida joins the conference, effective July 1, 1992.
 July 1, 1994 – Don Landry is named conference commissioner and conference relocates to Orlando.
 November 22, 1994 – Conference announces three-year deal to have postseason basketball tournament at The Lakeland Center. The SSC will serve as host in 1996 and 1997.
 December 1, 1994 – Sunshine Network announces nine-event television package for school year.
 June 9, 1995 – Inaugural SSC Awards Luncheon held in Orlando.
 February 29, 1996 – Inaugural SSC Hall of Fame/Honors banquet held in Lakeland.
 September 30, 1996 – University of North Florida withdraws from the Sunshine State Conference, effective June 30, 1997.
 October 15, 1996 – Women's crew added to Sunshine State Conference sponsored sports.
 December 18, 1996 – Lynn University joins the Sunshine State Conference, effective July 1, 1997.
 July 15, 1998 – League adds women's soccer and women's golf as sponsored sports.
 August 24, 1999 – Saint Leo College becomes Saint Leo University and adopts new nickname ("Lions") and logo.
 July 1, 2000 – 25th Anniversary of the Sunshine State Conference.
 August 26, 2002 – Nova Southeastern University joins the Sunshine State Conference as a provisional member.
 May 26, 2004 – Don Landry announced retirement as SSC Commissioner, effective August 1, 2004. Landry remained acting commissioner through September 6, 2004.
 July 26, 2004 – Michael J. Marcil named SSC commissioner, effective September 7, 2004.
 September 14, 2009 – Jay Jones officially begins duties as the SSC commissioner, replacing Mike Marcil, who left the post June 30, 2009.
 April 7, 2010 – League adds men's and women's swimming as sponsored sport.
 July 1, 2013 – League adds men's lacrosse as sponsored sport.
 February 3, 2014 – Ed Pasque officially begins duties as the SSC commissioner, replacing Jay Jones, who left the post December 31, 2013.
 July 1, 2014 – League adds women's lacrosse as sponsored sport. – Palm Beach Atlantic University and Embry–Riddle Aeronautical University join Sunshine State Conference as provisional members; effective July 1, 2015.

Member schools

Current members
The SSC currently has 11 full members, all are private schools: 

Notes

Former members
The SSC had three former full members, all but one were public schools: 

Notes

Membership timeline

Conference facilities

National Championships
Sunshine State Conference schools have won 114 NCAA Division II National Championships.

Championships by year

Championships by school

Controversy
On July 17, 2007, NCAA vacated Lynn's 2005 Women's Division II Softball Championship due to extra benefits given to two players. The NCAA found that former coach Thomas Macera gave two Lynn softball players cash payments totaling more than $3,000. Lynn was also placed on probation for two years. As of 2019-20 Lynn University has won 15 national championships at the Division II level, but now the NCAA recognizes only 14 of them because of the unsanctioned actions.

Mayors' Cup Champions
The Mayors' Cup was originally presented following the 1986-1987 academic year to recognize the annual SSC all-sports champion. The men's division recognizes competition in eight sports: soccer, cross country, basketball, swimming, golf, tennis, lacrosse and baseball. The Women's Mayors' Cup recognizes competition in nine sports: volleyball, soccer, cross country, basketball, swimming, golf, tennis, softball and rowing.

Sports

Men's sponsored sports by school

 Barry is adding Cross-Country and Swimming in 2023-24 Academic Year

Women's sponsored sports by school

Barry is adding Cross Country and Swimming in 2023-24 Academic Year.

Other sponsored sports by school

‡ — D-I sport

References

External links